Psalm 38 is the 38th psalm of the Book of Psalms, entitled "A psalm of David to bring to remembrance", is one of the 7 Penitential Psalms. In the slightly different numbering system used in the Greek Septuagint version of the Bible, and in the Latin Vulgate, this psalm is Psalm 37.

In the English King James Version of the Bible, it begins: "O lord, rebuke me not in thy wrath". In Latin, it is known as "".

The title "to bring to remembrance" also applies to Psalm 70.

Text

Hebrew Bible version 
The following is the Hebrew text of Psalm 38:

King James Version 
 O Lord, rebuke me not in thy wrath: neither chasten me in thy hot displeasure.
 For thine arrows stick fast in me, and thy hand presseth me sore.
 There is no soundness in my flesh because of thine anger; neither is there any rest in my bones because of my sin.
 For mine iniquities are gone over mine head: as a heavy burden they are too heavy for me.
 My wounds stink and are corrupt because of my foolishness.
 I am troubled; I am bowed down greatly; I go mourning all the day long.
 For my loins are filled with a loathsome disease: and there is no soundness in my flesh.
 I am feeble and sore broken: I have roared by reason of the disquietness of my heart.
 Lord, all my desire is before thee; and my groaning is not hid from thee.
 My heart panteth, my strength faileth me: as for the light of mine eyes, it also is gone from me.
 My lovers and my friends stand aloof from my sore; and my kinsmen stand afar off.
 They also that seek after my life lay snares for me: and they that seek my hurt speak mischievous things, and imagine deceits all the day long.
 But I, as a deaf man, heard not; and I was as a dumb man that openeth not his mouth.
 Thus I was as a man that heareth not, and in whose mouth are no reproofs.
 For in thee, O LORD, do I hope: thou wilt hear, O Lord my God.
 For I said, Hear me, lest otherwise they should rejoice over me: when my foot slippeth, they magnify themselves against me.
 For I am ready to halt, and my sorrow is continually before me.
 For I will declare mine iniquity; I will be sorry for my sin.
 But mine enemies are lively, and they are strong: and they that hate me wrongfully are multiplied.
 They also that render evil for good are mine adversaries; because I follow the thing that good is.
 Forsake me not, O LORD: O my God, be not far from me.
 Make haste to help me, O Lord my salvation.

Content
The psalm's topic is God's displeasure at sin (verses 1–11), and the psalmist's sufferings and prayers (verses 12–22). The psalm opens with a prayer, David felt as if he had been forgotten of his God. It then passes intermittently between complaint and hope. Benjamin Weiss noted the "depth of misery into which the psalmist gradually plunges in his complaints, then the sudden grasp at the arm of mercy and omnipotence".

Possibly written late in David's life, although Coffman's believes it was early in David's reign, it was often conjectured as a biography of sorts for David. John Calvin thought rather it was David's intent to commit to music to transmit what he had learnt through his life of the relationship he had with his Lord, before he died.

Uses

Judaism
Verse 22 is part of the long Tachanun recited on Mondays and Thursdays.

New Testament
Verse 11 is quoted in Luke .

Catholic Church

From around AD 530, this Psalm was traditionally sung in monasteries during matins on Mondays, according to the Rule of St. Benedict. Since reform of the Office of Readings after Vatican II, Psalm 37 is now recited during the liturgy of the hours on Friday in the second week of the four-weekly cycle of liturgical prayers.

Book of Common Prayer
In the Church of England's Book of Common Prayer, this psalm is appointed to be read on the morning of the eighth day of the month.

Ethiopian Orthodox Tewahedo Church
Verse 1 (which is almost identical to verse 1 of Psalm 6) is quoted in chapter 6 of 1 Meqabyan, a book considered canonical by this church.

Musical settings
Musical settings of Psalm 38 include:
  (psalm 37 according to the Vulgate numbering) was set  by Josquin des Prez.
 "Herr, straf mich nicht in deinem Zorn / Lass mich dein Grimm verzehren nicht" (not to be confused with "Herr, straf mich nicht in deinem Zorn / Das bitt ich dich von Herzen", a paraphrase of Psalm 6), Psalm 38 in the Becker Psalter, was set by Heinrich Schütz (SWV 135, Zahn No. 5859).
 Johann Sebastian Bach set Psalm 38:4 in the opening chorus of his church cantata Es ist nichts Gesundes an meinem Leibe, BWV 25.
Igor Stravinsky set Psalm 38:13-14 in the first movement of his Symphony of Psalms.

References

External links 

 Text of Psalms 1–41 from the 1979 Episcopal Book of Common Prayer
 
 
 Psalms Chapter 38 text in Hebrew and English, mechon-mamre.org
 A psalm of David. For remembrance. / LORD, do not punish me in your anger; in your wrath do not chastise me!a text and footnotes, usccb.org United States Conference of Catholic Bishops
 Psalm 38 / Refrain: Make haste to help me. Church of England
 Psalm 38 at biblegateway.com
 Hymns for Psalm 38 hymnary.org

038
Works attributed to David